Patna Film Festival is an international film festival in Patna, India. Participant countries include Iran, Canada, China, Japan, Sweden, Germany, Russia, the United States, and India. Patna Film Festival started in 2006. It was jointly organised by the Ministry of Information and Broadcasting, National Film Development Corporation (NFDC), directorate of the film festival, National Film Archive of India, Federation of Film Societies of India, and the state government.

History 
The first Patna Film Festival was held the week of February 11, 2006, at Mona Cinema hall, Patna.Shekhar Kapoor, Sudhir Mishra, Aziz Mirza, Shatrughan Sinha, Shekhar Suman, Manoj Bajpai, Prakash Jha were among the attendees. A total of 24 films from India, Iran, Canada, and China were screened, in the Bengali, Marathi and Malayalam languages. Hazaaron Khwaishein Aisi was the inaugural film.

The second event was held in February 2007. The foreign segment of the festival had one movie each in French, German, Italian, Japanese, and Swedish languages.

The third festival was held the week of April 5, 2008, at Regent Theater. Participant countries were Japan, Sweden, Germany, Russia, the United States, and India. Taare Zameen Par was the inaugural film. Bhojpuri, Kannada, Marathi and Telugu language films were also part of the festival.

Patna International Film Festival 

The organizers of renamed Patna International Film Festival (PIFF) launched a pre-festival campaign on March 22, 2015, in several districts of Bihar. The campaign started in Patna with a screening of Children of War, based on the 1971 Bangladesh war. Popular actors like Raima Sen, Riddhi Sen, and Pawan Malhotra, as well as director Mritunjay Devavrat, were present.

The PIFF, organized by Cineyatra, commenced at the BAMETI auditorium on April 16. Based on the theme a Ganga, Gandhi aur Balidana, it was the first of its kind in the state. It was decided to host the festival in April as Mahatma Gandhi visited Patna on April 10, 1917, before launching his Chamapran Satyagraha. Prior to that Gandhi held several meetings across the state. The theme aimed to commemorate his visit.

Fifteen feature films were screened, including six from Sri Lanka. Documentaries and short films were shown from altogether seven countries, including Sri Lanka, Australia, Indonesia, Japan, China, Nepal, and Malaysia. The PIFF concluded on the banks of the Ganga at Patna College.

Sri Lanka was granted a special guest status with a festival country (utsav desh) tag. Bihar and Sri Lanka share a common bond, especially because of Buddhism, which spread from Bihar to the island. Sri Lankans visit Bodh Gaya, the seat of Buddha's enlightenment. The festival logo included the Sri Lankan flag, says Raviraj Patel.

The festival was divided into four segments a Bharatiyam, Vishwachaya, Bihar in Cinema and Samkatha.

Guest film makers in PIFF : Vimukte Jay sundare from Sri Lanka, Dhanushka from Sri Lanka, Bijaya Jena, Sanjivan Lal, Karan Baali, Shubhadra Chaudhary, Sudhir Palsane, Dilip Patnayak, Joshi Joshef, Kapilash Bhuinyan and Susant Misra.

The festival was organized by Bihar state film development and finance corporation limited under the Art, Culture and Youth Department government of Bihar. Guest film personalities included Seema Kapoor, Lenin Rajendran, Uthara Unni, Pawan Malhotra, Sandeep Sawant, Paresh Mokashi, Nandu Madhav, Sabyasachi Mohapatra, Atal Bihari Panda, Susant Misra, Dilip Patnayak, Ramkumar Singh and Gajendra Sarotriya. The festival was coordinated and curated by Raviraj Patel, a youth filmmaker, and writer from Bihar.

See also 

 Cinema of Bihar

References 

Cinema of Bihar
Recurring events established in 2006
Film festivals in India
Culture of Patna
Festivals in Bihar